Charles O'Neill may refer to:
Charles O'Neill (musician) (1882–1964), Canadian bandmaster, composer, organist, cornetist, and music educator
Charles O'Neill (Pennsylvania politician) (1821–1893), U.S. Representative from Pennsylvania
Charles O'Neill (engineer) (1828–1900), Australasian philanthropist and politician
Charles H. O'Neill (1800–1897), U.S. politician
Charles O'Neill, 1st Earl O'Neill (1779–1841), Irish politician, peer and landowner
Charles O'Neill (Irish nationalist politician) (1849–1918), Member of Parliament for South Armagh, 1909–1918

See also
Charles O'Neal
Charles O'Neil